Jan Griffier II (1688–c.1750]) was an 18th-century painter active in England.

Biography
Griffier was born in England and died in London.  According to Houbraken, Jan Griffier's son Robert was born on 7 October 1688, but he mixed up his information on the son Robert Griffier with Jan Jr, who he didn't mention by name at all.

According to the Netherlands Institute for Art History he was the son of Jan Griffier I and the younger brother of Robert. He lived on Pall Mall and influenced the painter Christian August Lorentzen.

References

Jan Griffier on Artnet

1688 births
1750 deaths
18th-century English painters
English male painters
18th-century English male artists